Bongo is an Australian television series for which little information is available. Hosted by Russell Stubbings, it was a music show aimed at teenagers. It ran from 18 August 1960 to 17 November of the same year. It was a half-hour series, aired on Melbourne station GTV-9 (Australian television was not fully networked at the time). The series was preceded on the schedule by Gerry Gee's Happy Show and followed by the evening news. An issue of The Age newspaper features a picture of Stubbings and lists the series as being live.

See also
The Teenage Show
Six O'Clock Rock
Cool Cats Show
The Bert Newton Show
Teen Time
Youth Show

References

External links
Bongo on IMDb

1960 Australian television series debuts
Nine Network original programming
Australian music television series
Pop music television series
English-language television shows
Black-and-white Australian television shows
Australian live television series